The 2015–16 Serbian Cup season is the tenth season of the Serbian national football tournament.

The competition started on 2 September 2015.

The winner of the competition qualified for the 2016–17 UEFA Europa League.

Calendar

Preliminary round
A preliminary round was held in order to reduce the number of teams competing in the next round to 32. It consisted of 5 single-legged ties, with a penalty shoot-out as the decider if the score was tied after 90 minutes. This round featured the bottom 5 teams from the 2014–15 Serbian First League, as well as 5 regional cup winners. The draw contained seeded and unseeded teams. The bottom 5 teams from the 2014–15 Serbian First League (Sloboda Užice, Moravac Mrštane, Jedinstvo Užice, Sloga Kraljevo and Mačva Šabac) were set as unseeded teams, with the 5 regional cup winners (Zemun, Loznica, Jedinstvo Paraćin, ČSK Čelarevo and Mokra Gora) being set as seeded teams. The draw was held on 24 August 2015, and was conducted with the idea of minimizing expenses for the participating clubs. The matches were played on 2 September 2015. In total, around 4150 spectators attended the games (avg. 830 per game).

Round of 32
In this round, the five winners from the previous round were joined by all 16 teams from the 2014–15 Serbian SuperLiga, as well as the top 11 teams from the 2014–15 Serbian First League. The draw was held on 13 October 2015, and it contained seeded(16 teams from 2014–15 Serbian SuperLiga) and unseeded teams. Drawing of the lots was conducted by former national team player and head coach Ilija Petković. The matches were played on 27 and 28 October 2015. No extra time was played if the score was tied after the regular 90 minutes. Those games went straight to penalties. In total, around 19450 spectators attended the games (avg. 1215 per game).

Round of 16
The 16 winners from first round took part in this stage of the competition. The draw was held on 18 November 2015, and it contained seeded and unseeded teams. Seeded teams: Partizan, Red Star Belgrade, Čukarički, Vojvodina, OFK Beograd, Radnički Niš, Jagodina and Spartak Subotica. Unseeded teams: Voždovac, Borac Čačak, Napredak Kruševac (II), Donji Srem (II), Javor, Inđija (II), Bežanija (II) and BSK Borča (II). The seeds were determined by last season's final standings in the Serbian top divisions. Drawing of the lots was conducted by former national team player and head coach Slobodan Santrač. The matches were played on 2 December 2015. No extra time was played if the score was tied after the regular 90 minutes. Those games went straight to penalties. In total, around 10270 spectators attended the games (avg. 1284 per game).

Quarter-finals
The 8 winners from the second round took part in this stage of the competition. The draw was held on 24 December 2015, and it contained seeded and unseeded teams. The seeds were determined by following key: Last season's cup semifinalists were automatically set as seeded teams, while the remaining seeds were determined by last season's final standings in top Serbian divisions. Seeded teams: Partizan, Jagodina, Vojvodina and OFK Beograd. Unseeded teams: Radnički Niš, Spartak Subotica, Borac Čačak and Javor. Drawing of the lots was conducted by former national team player Jovan Aćimović. The matches were played on 2 March 2016. No extra time was played if the score was tied after the regular 90 minutes. Those games went straight to penalties. In total, around 3200 spectators attended the games (avg. 800 per game).

Semi-finals
The 4 winners from the Quarter finals(Partizan, Borac Čačak, Spartak Subotica and Javor) took part in the semi-finals. The draw was held on 8 March 2016 and there were no seedings in the draw. Drawing of the lots was conducted by national team coach Radovan Ćurčić. Semi-finals were contested over two legs. First legs were played on 16 March 2016, and the second legs were played on 20 April 2016.  In total, around 10000 spectators attended the games (avg. 2500 per game). The aggregate winners qualified for the final.

|}

First legs

Second legs

Final
Winners from the Semi-finals took part in the single-legged final. The match was played on 11 May 2016.

References

External links
 Official site

Serbian Cup seasons
Cup
Serbian Cup